Braydon King Sellers (born June 4, 2006) is an American soccer player who currently plays for MLS Next Pro side St. Louis City SC 2.

Career

Early 
Sellers was born in St. Louis, Missouri and raised in Ames, Iowa and St. Charles, Missouri. He previously played for Ames Soccer Club, Missouri Rush Soccer Club, Saint Louis FC Academy, Barça Residence Academy, and Lou Fusz Athletic Soccer Club.

St. Louis City 2
On March 10, 2023, Sellers was announced as part of the second St. Louis City SC 2 roster in MLS Next Pro.

On August 20, 2019, at age 13, Sellers "took the day off school to attend the '#MLS4theLou' Announcement [2m30s]."

International 
Sellers' first international experience was with GPS minor side in the 2019 SuperCupNI in Northern Ireland competing against academy squads from Greenisland F.C., Coleraine F.C., Glentoran F.C., Bertie Peacock Youths, Beijing Football Association (BFA), and Linfield F.C..

Sellers also competed in the 2019 International Champions Cup (ICC) Futures Tournament at IMG Academy in Bradenton, Florida. The ICC Midwest squad matched up with international academy teams from Juventus F.C. and CR Vasco da Gama.

Arriving in the Netherlands just days prior to the COVID-19 pandemic, Sellers attended and trained with the Feyenoord academy in Rotterdam.  His St. Louis Scott Gallagher side competed against three academies from Feyenoord, Excelsior, and BVV Barendrecht.

Personal life 

Braydon's mother Wendy Dillinger played professionally in the Women's United Soccer Association and for Indiana University.

Career statistics

References

External links

2006 births
Living people
American soccer players
MLS Next Pro players
Association football midfielders
Soccer players from Missouri
St. Louis City SC 2 players